Eleutherodactylus verruculatus is a species of frog in the family Eleutherodactylidae.
It is endemic to Mexico.

References

Sources

verruculatus
Amphibians described in 1870
Taxa named by Wilhelm Peters
Taxonomy articles created by Polbot